The Auburn–Ole Miss football rivalry is a college football rivalry game between the Tigers of Auburn University and the Rebels of the University of Mississippi.

History
Both founding members of the Southeastern Conference, Auburn and Ole Miss first met on October 20, 1928 in Birmingham, Alabama with Ole Miss winning the game by a score of 19–0. After a 14–7 Auburn victory in 1932, the teams didn't meet again until 1949, when the Rebels defeated the Tigers by a score of 40–7. They have met in two bowl games, with Ole Miss winning the 1965 Liberty Bowl by a margin of 13–7 and Auburn winning the 1971 Gator Bowl by a score of 35–28. The Gator victory marked the beginning of the longest winning streak in the series, with Auburn winning nine straight between 1971 and 1991. Auburn and Ole Miss have met every year since 1990 and, with the SEC placing both Auburn and Ole Miss in the West division in 1992, the teams will continue to meet annually.

The rivalry took a heated turn in 1999 when then-Ole Miss head coach Tommy Tuberville, after stating days prior that he would only leave Ole Miss "in a pine box", accepted the head coaching position at Auburn. Shortly thereafter, some began to refer to the annual Auburn–Ole Miss football matchup as the Pine Box Bowl. In the first matchup between the squads after Tuberville's departure for Auburn, the Rebels defeated Auburn by a score of 24–17 in overtime. Since the 1999 contest, Ole Miss has defeated Auburn only five times, the most recent of which came in the form of a 48-34 win in 2022.

Game results

See also  
 List of NCAA college football rivalry games

References

College football rivalries in the United States
Auburn Tigers football
Ole Miss Rebels football
Annual sporting events in the United States
Recurring sporting events established in 1928